Aristate means having a spiny or bristly tip and may refer to:
 An antenna shape
 Aristate (botany), a leaf shape